Local elections were held in London, city borough councils and in Scotland on 1 November 1934. The Labour Party gained many seats in sweeping successes throughout the country. In London they won 457 seats, which gave them control of 11 councils and enabling them to holding four. In chief provincial boroughs their net gains numbered 276 and gained 6 councils. There were also Scottish elections in which Labour also won many seats. The gains for Labour came at the expense of the Liberal Party which was by this stage had declining presence in both national and local elections as well as the Conservative Party.

Results

County Councils

England

Wales

London Metropolitan boroughs

References
Whitaker's Almanack 1936

 
1934